In enzymology, an allantoinase is an enzyme that catalyzes the chemical reaction

(S)-allantoin + H2O  allantoate

Thus, the two substrates of this enzyme are (S)-allantoin and H2O, whereas its product is allantoate.

This enzyme belongs to the family of hydrolases, those acting on carbon-nitrogen bonds other than peptide bonds, specifically in cyclic amides.  The systematic name of this enzyme class is (S)-allantoin amidohydrolase. This enzyme participates in purine metabolism.

References

 

EC 3.5.2
Enzymes of unknown structure